The Division of Curtin is an Australian electoral division in Western Australia.

History

The division was created in 1949 and is named for John Curtin, who was Prime Minister of Australia from 1941 to 1945. Prior to its creation, much of this area was part of the Division of Fremantle, which Curtin represented for most of the time from 1928 to 1945. It is located in the wealthy beachside suburbs of Perth, including Claremont, Cottesloe, Mosman Park, Nedlands, Subiaco and Swanbourne.

It was created as a notional Labor seat. However, this area was located in naturally Liberal territory, and the Liberals won it resoundingly as part of their massive victory in the 1949 election, turning it into a safe Liberal seat in one stroke. It was held by a Liberal or a conservative independent for the next 70 years. The only time it was out of Liberal hands came when Allan Rocher won it in 1996 after losing his Liberal endorsement. Rocher was defeated at the 1998 election, when Julie Bishop reclaimed it for the Liberals.

Its most prominent member has been Paul Hasluck, who was a senior Cabinet minister in the Menzies and Holt governments and then Governor-General of Australia after leaving politics. Other prominent members include Victor Garland, a minister in the McMahon and Fraser governments, and Bishop, the former Deputy Leader of the Liberal Party (the first woman to hold this role) and a minister in the Howard, Abbott, and Turnbull governments.

Bishop retired at the 2019 election, and Celia Hammond, a former vice chancellor of University of Notre Dame Australia, retained it for the Liberals with a reduced majority. With a two-party preferred margin of 14.3 percent, it was the fifth-safest Coalition seat in metropolitan Australia. However, at the 2022 election, Hammond lost over 11 percent of her primary vote, and lost the seat to teal independent Kate Chaney, granddaughter of former Liberal minister Fred Chaney Sr. and niece of former Liberal minister Fred Chaney Jr.

Geography
Since 1984, federal electoral division boundaries in Australia have been determined at redistributions by a redistribution committee appointed by the Australian Electoral Commission. Redistributions occur for the boundaries of divisions in a particular state, and they occur every seven years, or sooner if a state's representation entitlement changes or when divisions of a state are malapportioned.

In August 2021, the Australian Electoral Commission (AEC) announced that Curtin would gain the remainder of the suburb of Scarborough and parts of Gwelup, Karrinyup and Trigg from the abolished seat of Stirling. These boundary changes took place as of the 2022 election.

Curtin covers an area west of Perth, bordered by the Indian Ocean in the west and the Swan River in the south. The suburbs include:

 Churchlands
 City Beach 
 Claremont 
 Cottesloe 
 Crawley 
 Daglish 
 Dalkeith
 Doubleview 
 Floreat
 Glendalough
 Gwelup (part)
 Herdsman 
 Innaloo 
 Jolimont
 Karrakatta 
 Karrinyup (part)
 Mount Claremont 
 Mosman Park 
 Osborne Park (part)
 Nedlands 
 Peppermint Grove
 Scarborough
 Shenton Park 
 Swanbourne 
 Subiaco
 Trigg (part)
 West Leederville 
 Wembley
 Wembley Downs 
 Woodlands

Members

Election results

References

External links
 Division of Curtin - Australian Electoral Commission

Electoral divisions of Australia
Constituencies established in 1949
1949 establishments in Australia
Federal politics in Western Australia